"Brass Quintet No. 2" is a brass ensemble by Elliot Goldenthal. He composed it in 1980.

The quintet comes in three parts and is published as sheet music by G. Schirmer, Inc.

Piece Listing
I Quinque
II Cortege
III Rondo Burlesque

Concerts
It was recently recorded by the brass ensemble Extension Ensemble for their 2004 album New York Presence.

References

Compositions by Elliot Goldenthal
1980 compositions